Route 359 is a 32 km north–south regional road in Quebec, Canada, going from Champlain to Grand-Mère. It is one of the direct roads linking Autoroute 40 (exit 220) to the Shawinigan-Grand-Mère area.

It goes through the villages of Saint-Luc-de-Vincennes and Lac-à-la-Tortue.

Municipalities along Route 359

 Champlain
 Saint-Luc-de-Vincennes
 Saint-Narcisse
 Shawinigan

Major intersections

See also
 List of Quebec provincial highways

References

External links 
 Provincial Route Map (Courtesy of the Quebec Ministry of Transportation) 
 Route 359 on Google Maps

359
Transport in Shawinigan